Eugene Ostroff (6 July 1928 – 26 August 1999) was a historian and curator of the Photographic History Collection at the National Museum of American History.

References

External links 

 Smithsonian work history at Smithsonian Archives

1928 births
1999 deaths
20th-century American historians
20th-century American male writers
American male non-fiction writers